Philip Barton Key II (April 5, 1818 – February 27, 1859) was an American lawyer who served as U.S. Attorney for the District of Columbia. He is most famous for his public affair with Teresa Bagioli Sickles, and his eventual murder at the hands of her husband, Congressman Daniel Sickles of New York. Sickles defended himself by adopting a defense of temporary insanity, the first time the defense had been used in the United States.

Biography 

Born in Georgetown, D.C., Key was the son of Francis Scott Key and the great-nephew of Philip Barton Key. He was also a nephew of Chief Justice Roger B. Taney. He married Ellen Swan, the daughter of a Baltimore attorney, on November 18, 1845. Allegedly the most handsome man in Washington and by 1859 a widower with four children, Key was known to be flirtatious with many women.

Key was appointed to his father's former position, United States Attorney for the District of Columbia, by President Pierce in September 1853, during a recess of the Senate; the Senate later confirmed his nomination in March 1854. Four years later, he was nominated, and confirmed again, for another four-year term; thus, he would serve until his death.

 
Sometime in the spring of 1858, Teresa Sickles began an affair with Key. Dan Sickles, though a serial adulterer himself, had accused his much-younger wife of adultery several times during their five-year marriage, she had repeatedly denied it to his satisfaction. But then Sickles received a poison pen letter informing him of his wife's affair with Key. He confronted his wife, who confessed to the affair. Sickles then made his wife write out her confession on paper.

Sickles saw Key sitting on a bench outside the Sickles home on February 27, 1859, signalling to Teresa, and confronted him. Sickles rushed outside into Lafayette Square, cried "Key, you scoundrel, you have dishonored my home; you must die", and with a pistol repeatedly shot the unarmed Key.

Death
Key was taken into the nearby Benjamin Ogle Tayloe House, where he died sometime later.

Sickles was acquitted based on temporary insanity, a crime of passion, in one of the most controversial trials of the 19th century. It was the first successful use of the defense in the United States.  One of Sickles' attorneys, Edwin Stanton, later became the Secretary of War. Newspapers declared Sickles a hero for "saving" women from Key. Years later, while attending the theater in New York City, Sickles became aware of the presence of Key's son, James Key, in the audience; both men watched each other throughout the performance. Nothing happened.

Key is buried in Oak Hill Cemetery, with a dedicatory in his son-in-law's family plot in Westminster Hall and Burying Ground in Baltimore.

Notes

References

External links 
 One of Teresa's Sickles escorts was Philip Barton Key
 
 The Political Graveyard

1818 births
1859 deaths
1859 murders in the United States
People from Georgetown (Washington, D.C.)
American murder victims
Daniel Sickles
Burials at Westminster Hall and Burying Ground
American prosecutors
People murdered in Washington, D.C.
Deaths by firearm in Washington, D.C.
United States Attorneys for the District of Columbia
Key family of Maryland
Lloyd family of Maryland
Burials at Oak Hill Cemetery (Washington, D.C.)